Carlos Alberto Brilhante Ustra (28 July 1932 – 15 October 2015) was a Brazilian army officer and politician who served as a colonel in the Brazilian Army.

Biography 
Born in Santa Maria, Rio Grande do Sul, Ustra was the head of the DOI-CODI, an investigation division of the Second Army from 1970 to 1974. He became known by the codename Dr. Tibiriçá. While head of DOI-CODI, 47 people officially died, although further investigation attributed 502 tortures to the division under his administration.

In 2008, Ustra became the first military official to be recognized, by a civil court in São Paulo, as a torturer during the dictatorship. He continued to be politically active in military clubs, in defense of the military dictatorship and anticommunist critics.

He died at the age of 83 on 15 October 2015 of pneumonia caused by multiple organ failure after several weeks in hospital in Brasília.

Legacy 
On 17 April 2016, during the voting of the impeachment of Dilma Rousseff in the Chamber of Deputies, Ustra was praised by deputy and future president of Brazil Jair Bolsonaro (PSC) in his discourse, calling him "the dread of Dilma Rousseff".

On 8 August 2019 Jair Bolsonaro called him a "national hero" who prevented Brazil from falling into what the left-wing wants today".

The Brazilian Government makes a  R$15.307,90 monthly payment to Ustra's daughters.

Works

 Rompendo o Silêncio (1974)
 A Verdade Sufocada (2006) - a memoir book about the military dictatorship in Brazil.

References 

1932 births
2015 deaths
Brazilian anti-communists
Far-right politics in Brazil
Military dictatorship in Brazil
People from Santa Maria, Rio Grande do Sul
Deaths from pneumonia in Federal District (Brazil)
20th-century Brazilian military personnel